The 2015 FIFA Women's World Cup qualification UEFA Group 7 was a UEFA qualifying group for the 2015 FIFA Women's World Cup. The group comprised Austria, Bulgaria, Finland, France, Hungary and Kazakhstan.

The group winners qualified directly for the 2015 FIFA Women's World Cup. Among the seven group runners-up, the four best (determined by records against the first-, third-, fourth- and fifth-placed teams only for balance between different groups) advanced to the play-offs.

Standings

Results
All times are CEST (UTC+02:00) during summer and CET (UTC+01:00) during winter.

Goalscorers
14 goals
 Gaëtane Thiney

10 goals
 Sanna Talonen

9 goals
 Marie-Laure Delie

7 goals
 Eugénie Le Sommer
 Fanni Vágó
 Lisa Makas

6 goals
 Nina Burger

5 goals
 Wendie Renard

4 goals

 Camille Abily
 Louisa Nécib
 Emmi Alanen
 Lilla Sipos

3 goals

 Jennifer Pöltl
 Sarah Puntigam
 Élise Bussaglia
 Élodie Thomis
 Dóra Zeller
 Begaim Kirgizbaeva
 Nicole Billa

2 goals

 Borislava Kireva
 Adelina Engman
 Carina Wenninger
 Sanna Saarinen
 Annica Sjölund
 Juliette Kemppi
 Mariya Yalova

1 goal

 Verena Aschauer
 Laura Feiersinger
 Nadine Prohaska
 Silvia Radoyska
 Tuija Hyyrynen
 Annika Kukkonen
 Maija Saari
 Linda Ruutu
 Anna Westerlund
 Sabrina Delannoy
 Laura Georges
 Amandine Henry
 Amel Majri
 Henrietta Csiszár
 Zsanett Jakabfi
 Zsanett Kaján
 Anita Padár
 Zsófia Rácz
 Boglárka Szabó
 Madina Zhanatayeva

1 own goal
 Nikoleta Boycheva (playing against Austria)
 Silvia Radoyska (playing against Kazakhstan)
 Maija Saari (playing against Austria)
 Réka Demeter (playing against Austria)
 Angéla Smuczer (playing against France)
 Gabriella Tóth (playing against Austria)

References

External links
Women's World Cup – Qualifying round Group 7, UEFA.com

Group 7
2013 in Kazakhstani football
2014 in Kazakhstani football
2013 in Finnish football
2014 in Finnish football
2013–14 in Austrian football
2014–15 in Austrian football
2013–14 in Hungarian football
2014–15 in Hungarian football
2013–14 in French women's football
Qual
2013–14 in Bulgarian football
2014–15 in Bulgarian football